Triangle Service is a small Japanese video game developer. They develop games in the shoot 'em up genre (known as STG in Japan). It was founded by programmer Toshiaki Fujino in 2002.

History

Fujino had previously been a programmer of Konami Computer Entertainment Japan East and the defunct Japanese branch-office of Korean manufacturer Oriental Soft. Fujino began independent development in 2001 before founding his own studio in 2002, named Triangle Service.

Games developed

Arcade Games

Console Games

Notes
 Contains Exzeal and Shmups Skill Test
 Only available via Games on Demand
 Compilation release

References

External links
 
Toshiaki Fujino interview by EDGE with Triangle Service (interviews to G.rev and Milestone on the same page)

Video game companies established in 2002
Amusement companies of Japan
Video game companies of Japan
Video game development companies